Guy Martin (born 3 February 1957) is a French chef who earned three stars from the Guide Michelin. He is currently working the restaurant Le Grand Véfour in Paris.

Life and career 
Self-taught, Martin began his career as a pizzaiolo at age 17. He received his first Michelin star in 1984 after only six months as chef with a team of only three people. Martin then became head chef of the restaurant Le Grand Vefour that received three Michelin stars (reduced to two stars in 2008).

In 2010, Martin was chosen to prepare the celebratory meal of the annexation of Savoie to France, held at the Château of the dukes of Savoie in Chambéry and cooked for the former French President Nicolas Sarkozy himself.

Since 2011, Martin has hosted the television program Épicerie fine, for two seasons of 35 episodes, in which he travels to discover the origin of various foods and gives tips to prepare them. The program is broadcast on TV5 Monde, Cuisine TV and Voyage et Campagnes TV.

Honours 
 1997 : Chevalier of the Ordre des Arts et des Lettres
 2002 : Chevalier of the Ordre des Palmes Académiques
 2003 : Chevalier of the Légion d'honneur
 2012 : Officier of the Légion d'honneur

External links 
 Official site of the restaurant Le Grand Véfour
 Official site of the Atelier Guy Martin
 Official site of the restaurant Guy Martin Italia

1957 births
French chefs
Head chefs of Michelin starred restaurants
Chevaliers of the Ordre des Arts et des Lettres
Chevaliers of the Légion d'honneur
Officiers of the Légion d'honneur
People from Bourg-Saint-Maurice
Living people